Kumdere can refer to:

 Kumdere, İpsala
 Kumdere, Tarsus